is a railway station in the city of Nikkō, Tochigi, Japan, operated by the private railway operator Tobu Railway. The station is numbered "TN-21".

Lines

Station layout
The station is unmanned with a single island platform connected to the station entrance by a footbridge.

Platforms

Adjacent stations

History
Shimo-goshiro Station opened on 7 July 1929. It became unstaffed from 1 September 1973. A new station building was completed in 2007.

From 17 March 2012, station numbering was introduced on all Tobu lines, with Shimo-goshiro Station becoming "TN-21".

Passenger statistics
In fiscal 2019, the station was used by an average of 190 passengers daily (boarding passengers only).

Surrounding area
Goshiro Middle School

See also
 List of railway stations in Japan

References

External links

 Shimo-goshiro Station information 

Railway stations in Tochigi Prefecture
Stations of Tobu Railway
Railway stations in Japan opened in 1929
Tobu Nikko Line
Nikkō, Tochigi